Omonville-la-Petite is a former commune in the Manche department in Normandy in north-western France. On 1 January 2017, it was merged into the new commune La Hague.

Ormonville is known to be the place where French poet Jacques Prévert (1900–1977) lived the last years of his life and where he is buried.

It is also the birthplace of French biologist Félix Mesnil (1868–1938).

See also
Communes of the Manche department

References

Omonvillelapetite